La Ceiba Bilingual School (or CBS) is a bilingual (English/Spanish) school located in La Ceiba, Honduras. Like many bilingual schools in Honduras it follows the US school-year (fall to spring). It is located in the El Sauce neighborhood. 

Schools in Honduras
Bilingual schools